Alexandre Maspoli (29 September 1875 – 25 September 1943) was a French sculptor and weightlifter. He came joint third in the two-hand lift event at the 1906 Intercalated Games in Athens, and was amateur weightlifting champion 19 years in a row.

Career

Sports career
Maspoli was born in Lyon, France. He was an amateur weightlifting champion 19 years in a row. Maspoli won the combined events at the unofficial 1902 Weightlifting World Championships, setting a new world record in the process. In 1905, Maspoli won the French National Championships. In the throwing event, he threw . At the 1906 Intercalated Games in Athens, Maspoli came joint third in the two hand lift event. Maspoli, Heinrich Schneidereit and Heinrich Rondl all lifted . He also participated in the one hand lift event, where he finished fourth, and the standing long jump event, where he finished 18th. In 1907, Maspoli retained his French National Championship title.

Sculpture

After the First World War, Maspoli was commissioned to build war memorials in La Côte-Saint-André and Arcachon. The Arcachon memorial promoted pacifism and the loss of families in the war. He submitted two works, Jet du boulet and Mask of Philippides, for the mixed sculpture event at the 1924 Summer Olympics in Paris. He was not awarded a medal. In 1928, Maspoli created a bust memorial to historian . In 1933, Maspoli was commissioned to create a monument to sportsman and journalist Frantz Reichel in the 16th arrondissement of Paris. The sculpture was finished the following year. For this monument, he became the first winner of the  award in 1934. The award was created by the Syndicat National des Journalistes sportifs (National Union of Sports Journalists) for the best "sporting act" of the year. In 1938, he built a statue to politician  in Lyon.

Notes

References

External links
 Sports Reference

1875 births
1943 deaths
Sportspeople from Lyon
Weightlifters at the 1906 Intercalated Games
French male weightlifters
Medalists at the 1906 Intercalated Games
French male long jumpers
20th-century French sculptors
Olympic competitors in art competitions
World Weightlifting Championships medalists
Athletes (track and field) at the 1906 Intercalated Games
19th-century French people